Johnny Frigo (December 27, 1916 – July 4, 2007) was an American jazz violinist, bassist and songwriter. He appeared in the 1940s as a violinist before working as a bassist. He returned to the violin in the 1980s and enjoyed a comeback, recording several albums as a leader.

Biography
Frigo was born in Chicago and studied violin for three years beginning at age seven. In high school he started to play double bass in dance orchestras. In 1942 he played with Chico Marx's orchestra and performed a comedy routine on violin with Marx on piano. He entered the United States Coast Guard during World War II and played in a band on Ellis Island with Al Haig and Kai Winding.

After a brief turn at active service near the end of the war he moved to New Jersey. He toured with Jimmy Dorsey's band from 1945 to 1947, later forming the Soft Winds trio with Dorsey's guitarist Herb Ellis and pianist Lou Carter. During this time he wrote the music and lyrics to "Detour Ahead", which has been recorded by Billie Holiday, Sarah Vaughan, Ella Fitzgerald, Bill Evans, and Carola. During that time, he also wrote the sardonic swing tune "I Told Ya I Love Ya, Now Get Out" which was recorded by June Christy and the Stan Kenton Orchestra. Chicago jazz vocalist Erin McDougald recorded the song 50 years later on her album The Auburn Collection (2004).

In 1951, Frigo returned to Chicago, primarily working as a studio bassist and arranger. He also led the band at Mr. Kelly's, a popular Rush Street nightspot. Between 1951 and 1960 he played fiddle hoedowns and novelties with the Sage Riders, the house band for the WLS radio program National Barn Dance. He played with the Sage Riders for another fourteen years after WGN revived the show in 1961. In that time he worked with Chicago jazz vocalist Anita O'Day in live and studio recordings done in Chicago. He was featured (on bass) on O'Day's quartet version of "No Soap, No Hope Blues". Frigo is credited as playing fiddle for the track "A Rectangle Picture" on the Mason Proffit album Wanted released in 1969 on the Happy Tiger label.

In the mid-1980s Frigo largely abandoned playing bass to concentrate on violin. After performing with Monty Alexander, Ray Brown, and Herb Ellis at Chicago's Jazz Showcase, he was invited by Alexander to join the trio for several live dates that produced Triple Treat II and Triple Treat III (Concord, 1987). Johnny Carson asked Frigo why it took so long to start his career as a violinist. Frigo replied, "I wanna take as long as I could in my life so I wouldn't have time to become a has-been".

He performed as a jazz violinist at festivals worldwide, including the Umbria Jazz Festival and North Sea Jazz Festival. Frigo also was a published poet and artist and played flugelhorn. He wrote and performed the 1969 Chicago Cubs fight song "Hey Hey, Holy Mackerel".

Death
Frigo died of cancer in a Chicago hospital on July 4, 2007 at age 90.

Personal life
Frigo was married twice and had one son with each wife. He was survived by his second wife, the former Brittney Browne, and one son, jazz drummer Richard "Rick" Frigo, who was born to his first wife, Dorothy Hachmeister. His other son, Derek John Frigo, who was born to Browne, was the lead guitarist for the rock band Enuff Z'nuff. Derek Frigo died of a drug overdose on May 28, 2004.

Discography

As leader

As sideman

References

Sources
When My Fiddle's in the Case: The Poetry and Paintings of Jazz Violinist Johnny Frigo. Lost Coast Press, 2004

External links
NPR Obituary
Obituary at Jazzhouse

1916 births
2007 deaths
20th-century American violinists
American jazz musicians
American jazz violinists
American people of Italian descent
Chesky Records artists
American male violinists
Musicians from Chicago
Swing violinists
Jazz musicians from Illinois
20th-century American male musicians
American male jazz musicians
Statesmen of Jazz members
Deaths from cancer in Illinois
Arbors Records artists